Thomas Leon Rayam (born January 3, 1968) is a former American football offensive lineman who played in the National Football League and Canadian Football League. He played college football for the Alabama Crimson Tide, and is remembered for blocking Penn State's last-second field-goal attempt in a 17–16 Alabama win in 1989.

His older brother Hardy Rayam played for the Notre Dame Fighting Irish under coach Dan Devine.

References

External links 
 
 Profile at JustSportsStats.com

1968 births
Living people
American football offensive linemen
Canadian football offensive linemen
American players of Canadian football
Alabama Crimson Tide football players
Washington Redskins players
Cincinnati Bengals players
Birmingham Barracudas players
Edmonton Elks players
Calgary Stampeders players
Toronto Argonauts players
Players of American football from Orlando, Florida
Players of Canadian football from Orlando, Florida